The Noord-Brabantsch-Deutsche Spoorweg-Maatschappij (NBDS) was a railway company undertaking and providing rail transport between Boxtel and Wesel via Uden, Veghel, Gennep, Goch and Xanten. This railway was known in the Netherlands as "Duits lijntje " (German line). On July 15, 1873, the section from Boxtel to Goch could be opened. On July 1, 1878, the second section of the line, the section from Goch to Wesel, could be opened. The total length of the line was 92.7 kilometers, of which 52.7 kilometers on Dutch territory. From Büderich, another 8.2 kilometers of the Köln-Mindener Eisenbahn was used, so was a part of the line from Venlo via Wesel to Haltern, Münster and Hamburg.

History

NBDS 
On May 28, 1869, the Noord-Brabantsch-Deutsche Spoorweg-Maatschappij (NBDS) was founded. The purpose of the company was the transport of goods and people on the railways Boxtel - Gennep - Goch - Wesel and Gennep - Kleve. The board of directors of the company was as follows:

 President: Willem Hendrik van Meukeren, Rotterdam
 Vice President: Hyacinthus Constantinus Fredericus Kerstens, Mill
 Secretary: Jan van Stipriaan Luiscuis, Vlaardingen
 Maria Frans Rudolph Joseph Willem Hubert Ludwig Philip Apolina Baron von Monschauw, Goch
 Charles James Appleby, London
 Johannes van den Boogaard, Gennep

Subsequent presidents were Hyacinthus Constantinus Fredericus Kerstens (until 1886) and Johannes Marinus Voorhoeve (1886-1919).

On May 28, 1869, Van Meukeren received the final Dutch concession for the construction of a railway from Boxtel via Gennep to the Prussian borders in the directions to Kleve and Wesel. On February 14, 1872, the final concession of the Prussian government followed. The company was initially based in Rotterdam, but moved to Gennep. The central workshop was also located there. The NBDS line was opened with the intention of being part of the fastest London – Berlin – Saint Petersburg connection. From 1881 express trains (boat trains) ran on this line, with which one could travel from Vlissingen via Wesel to Berlin and Hamburg without having to change trains. From Vlissingen station, the journey could be continued with ships of the Stoomvaart Maatschappij Zeeland, which took the travelers to Queenborough. Here it was possible to transfer to the trains of the London, Chatham and Dover Railway towards London. Because of this comfort, many monarchs and diplomats made use of this route for their European travels. Postal carriages and passenger carriages from the CIWL (WL and WR) rode along on the trains (mail trains). The German border station was Goch and Hassum, the Dutch one was Gennep. The railway was called the "German Line"; in Germany, the name was Boxteler Bahn.

Between Büderich and Wesel, the NBDS used a 1950m long railway bridge over the Rhine. It was built between 1872 and 1874, as part of the construction of the Hamburg – Münster – Wesel – Straelen – Venlo line by the Köln-Mindener Eisenbahn. Another important work of art on the 100 km long section was the Maasbrug near Gennep.

The First World War put an end to this prominent traffic in 1914. During this period, mainly refugees from England and America made use of the NBDS through the then neutral Netherlands. On June 1, 1919, the SS took over the operations of the line. On November 15, 1922, the NBDS was declared bankrupt by the court of Rotterdam. July 1, 1925, the Deutsche Reichsbahn-Gesellschaft took over the German section of the railway. This meant that the railway company was now nationalized on both sides of the border. The workshop was closed that same year. Express trains no longer ran on this section. The line was relegated to sidelines on both sides. In the Netherlands, on August 1, 1924, the line became nothing more than a branch line.

The railway after bankruptcy 
At the end of World War II, the railway bridge at Wesel was blown up by the retreating German Wehrmacht on March 10, 1945. the German section of het Duitse lijntje came to an end. In the years 1949-1967 the German part was closed and broken up (Goch – Hassum Closed to passengers in 1949 and to goods in 1967 and Goch – Uedem closed to passngers in 1963 and to goods in 1966). During the Second World War, the section between Xanten and Uedem had been damaged so many times by Canadian soldiers that it was never repaired. A road was constructed on the Goch – Uedem route.

In 1950, the NS ended the last piece of passenger traffic on the Boxtel – Uden line. In 1970 goods traffic on the Uden – Gennep section was terminated. The Maasbrug near Gennep was dismantled in 1973. The adjacent road bridge was built in 1955 on a railway bridge that was intended to be the one that never existed. In 2004 Railion ended goods traffic on the part from Boxtel to Veghel.

In protest against ProRail's plans to break up the connection at Boxtel, trips were made on Easter Monday 2005 with a steam engine and a light rail vehicle.

Locomotives and rolling stock

Locomotives 
In 1873 the company had seven steam locomotives. Five tender engines were delivered in 1873 by Beyer, Peacock & Company of Manchester, England (numbers 1 to 5). These locomotives with the wheel arrangement 1'B (2-4-0) had the names "Gijsbert van Beverwijk", "Sophia", "Mina", "Lucinda" and "Henriëtta".

Before that, two tank engines had already been put into service. These were built by Fox, Walker & Company of Bristol (including number 11) and built in 1871–1872.

For goods traffic, four C (0-6-0) locomotives were delivered in 1878 from Hohenzollern Locomotive Works, Düsseldorf. These were given the numbers 12 to 15. Two more followed in 1902 (no. 16) and 1907 (no. 17).

Two heavier 1'B (2-4-0) locomotives were purchased from Hohenzollern in 1881 to pull the express trains, followed by a third one in 1887 (numbers 8 to 10).Between 1892 and 1894 three more locomotives were purchased, again 1'B (2-4-0) locomotives, built by Beyer-Peacock & Company. These had the numbers 6, 7 and 11.

The increasingly heavier postal trains made the NBDS decide in 1907 to purchase even bigger express locomotives with the 2'C (4-6-0) wheel arrangement. These were the first locomotives to use this wheel arrangement in the Netherlands. Six engines arrived in 1908, numbers 30-35 (later NS series 3500). Since they had not yet gained experience with 2'C locomotives in the Netherlands, the NBDS had the locomotives built in England by Beyer-Peacock, Manchester. on a few occasions, These locomotives nicknamed 'Blauwe Brabanders' (Blue Brabander) ran express trains all the way to Haltern, Münster, Essen, Dortmund or to Oberhausen. As late as World War I, a new 2'C (4-6-0) No. 36 and two new 1'D (2-8-0) Nos. 118 and 119 goods locomotives and were delivered by Hohenzollern, Düsseldorf. The NBDS also had three shunting locomotives with the wheel arrangement B t (0-4-0T). Number 26 was built in 1894 and was built by Henschel & Company in Kassel. This manufacturer also built number 26 in 1898. In 1907 another shunting locomotive with number 24 was built by Werkspoor in Amsterdam. The NBDS had its own workshop in Gennep for the maintenance of the locomotives and rollingstock.

Since February 19, 1977, a steam locomotive has been placed near the Brabantweg in Gennep in memory of the NBDS. This monument is a former tank engine of the Deutsche Bundesbahn with the number 94 1640. This class never been service with the NBDS. Not a single locomotive of the NBDS itself has survived.

Passenger rolling stock

Goods rollingstock

Sources and references 

 W.S. van Dinter: Gedenkschrift Noord-Brabantsch-Duitsche Spoorwegmaatschappij en Spoormonument Lok 94 te Gennep, Gennep: Noord Limburgse Boekhandel 1982.
 J.W.M. Peijnenburg, V.M. Freriks: De spoorlijn Boxtel - Wezel in „Kruispunt Beugen“, Nijmegen - Venlo 1983.
 Michael Lehmann: Der Blaue Brabant – Die Geschichte der Boxteler Bahn. 
 Hans Schlieper, Vincent Freriks. Die Boxteler Bahn, Die Nord-Brabant-Deutsche Eisenbahn-Gesellschaft und die internationale Vlissinger Postroute. DGEG Werl 2014 
 Die Boxteler Bahn
 Die Geschichte der Nord-Brabant-Deutsche Eisenbahn Gesellschaft (NBDS).

Transport in North Rhine-Westphalia
Defunct railway companies of Germany
Former Dutch railway company
Noord-Brabantsch-Duitsche Spoorweg-Maatschappij